Martin Hengel (14 December 1926 – 2 July 2009) was a German historian of religion, focusing on the "Second Temple Period" or "Hellenistic Period" of early Judaism and Christianity.

Biography

Hengel was born in Reutlingen, south of Stuttgart, in 1926 and grew up in nearby Aalen. In 1943 he was conscripted as a 17-year-old schoolboy into the Wehrmacht and served in an anti-aircraft battery on the Western Front. In 1945, after one of the final battles of World War II, he threw away his weapons and uniform and walked home from France, completing his schooling in 1946. In late 1947 Hengel began his theological studies in Tübingen, moving to the University of Heidelberg in 1949. In 1951 he qualified as a Lutheran parish minister, but in 1954 his father voiced his opposition to this and insisted that he join 'Hengella', the family textile business in Aalen, which makes women's underwear and lingerie.

This caused a ten-year struggle for Hengel, who had to study when he could based around his working hours. The strain on his health led to a serious breakdown. He later referred to these ten years as "wasted years" and gave the impression of almost having an inferiority complex about the amount of study he had been forced to miss. However, he remained  a director of the company until his death. In August 1957 he married Marianne Kistler.

For a short period he was also able to lecture at a theological college, and served as an assistant to Professor Otto Michel in Tübingen, but this ended in 1957 when he was sent to manage a factory in Leicester for several years. He continued to work on his doctoral thesis in his spare time. Hengel graduated in 1959 with a PhD. He completed his postgraduate work on his Habilitation thesis, a requirement for academic teaching, at the University of Tübingen in 1967. His thesis was concerned with Judaism and Hellenism. He was a professor at the University of Erlangen starting in 1968. In 1972 Hengel returned to Tübingen to succeed Professor Michel.

Recognized as one of the greatest theological scholars of his time, Martin Hengel focused a great amount of his studies upon the New Testament as well as other theological writings of early Christianity. Hengel specialized in the early period of Rabbinic Judaism including early Christianity and the origins of Christianity. Throughout his writings, Hengel openly recognizes the challenges involved in developing a thorough history of early Christianity. Due to the fact that the sources available to scholars are often found surviving in fragments, as a result, "the sparseness of the sources vitiates our knowledge of large areas of the ancient world".  In his article "Raising the Bar: A daring proposal for the future of evangelical New Testament scholarship", Hengel therefore challenges scholars to delve into more extensive biblical research to ensure proper understandings of the texts being established.  
Hengel's Christology strove to share an accurate illumination of who Jesus was and what he did and sought after as well as the notion that ‘Christianity emerged completely from within Judaism’. After his experience as a soldier in the Second World War, Hengel said:

"As for these specific errors that have affected my own country, today one may say that among the most important insights of our field of study since the Second World War belongs the recognition of how deeply rooted earliest Christianity is in Judaism as its native soil. This implies that the study of the pre-Christian Judaism of the Hellenistic period as a whole, that is, from the fourth century BCE on, is to be included in our field of study. Here Old and New Testament scholars must work hand in hand".

Not only did Hengel desire that scholars "work hand in hand" but also was known for supporting scholars of all backgrounds.
In 1992 he was Emeritus Professor of New Testament and Early Judaism at the University of Tübingen. This period of Judaism includes early Christianity and the field known as Christian Origins. Much scholarly work is currently being done around the intersection of Hellenism, Judaism, Paganism, and Christianity and the ways in which these terms are potentially problematic for the Second-Temple era. Such work of the past two or three decades follows 50 years of work by Hengel, who reconceptualized the scholarly approach to the period in such works as Judentum und Hellenismus, and other scholars.

Within his studies of Rabbinic Judaism and the origins of Christianity, Hengel explored the perceived dichotomy between Judaism and Hellenism. In his study, Judentum und Hellenismus, he documented that the designation of the apostle Paul exclusively as either Jewish or Hellenistic is a misunderstanding. Hengel argues in his writings that despite Paul's controversial rhetoric scholars, along with Jewish and Christian communities, must recognize the historical value of Paul's epistles and Luke's account of Paul's life within the Acts of the Apostles.  Hengel recognizes the importance of this awareness because of the multifaceted insight provided about the Second Temple Era and Hellenistic Judaism of the first century within these texts.

A large portion of Martin Hengel's research on the canonical book, the Acts of the Apostles, focuses on the time in which Paul spends between his time in Damascus and Antioch coining these years as "the unknown years". Between Acts and the letters of Paul, Hengel, among other scholars, attempts to piece together the extent of the missionary work of Paul the apostle. Hengel highlights Paul as an "apostle to all nations" (Rom 11:13) throughout his interpretations. He also highlights the miracle of the preservation of the letters of Paul and acknowledges, in correlation with the book of Acts (which set the letters within a historical context), we receive the "nucleus of quite a new form of theological writing in earliest Christianity… and thus also for the New Testament canon".

He considered the traditional account that the Gospel of Mark was written by Peter's interpreter (John Mark, also known as Mark the Evangelist) to be essentially credible. He also believed that Luke the Evangelist (the companion of Paul the Apostle) was the author of the Gospel of Luke and the Acts of the Apostles. 

His Institute for Ancient Judaism and Hellenistic Religion attracted scholars from all over the world, including Israel, and the Philip Melanchthon Foundation, which he founded, brought young scholars close to the world of Greek and Roman antiquity.

He received honorary doctorates from the universities of Uppsala, St Andrews, Cambridge, Durham, Strasbourg and Dublin. He was a corresponding member of the British Academy and the Royal Netherlands Academy of Arts and Sciences.
Hengel died aged 82 in Tübingen, and is survived by his wife, Marianne.

Works

 
——— (1974). Property and Riches in the Early Church (1st English ed.). London: SCM Press (translated by John Bowden).

References

External links

Obituary in The Times Retrieved on 21 July 2009
Obituary in The Daily Telegraph Retrieved on 21 July 2009
Interview at Centre for Public Christianity

1926 births
2009 deaths
People from Reutlingen
German biblical scholars
New Testament scholars
German historians of religion
German Lutheran theologians
20th-century German Protestant theologians
Heidelberg University alumni
Members of the Royal Netherlands Academy of Arts and Sciences
University of Tübingen alumni
Academic staff of the University of Erlangen-Nuremberg
Academic staff of the University of Tübingen
German male non-fiction writers
Lutheran biblical scholars
20th-century Lutherans
Corresponding Fellows of the British Academy